"Smile" is a song by American singer Katy Perry for her sixth studio album of the same name (2020). It was released on July 10, 2020 by Capitol Records as the second single from the album, along with the album's pre-order. Musically, it is a nu-disco song which samples Naughty by Nature's 1999 song "Jamboree". On the song, Perry talks about expressing her gratitude for changes in her life. A version featuring American rapper Diddy is featured on some vinyl versions of the album, while remixes of the song by Giorgio Moroder and Joel Corry have also been released to promote the song.

Background and composition
The song was officially released on July 10, 2020 along with the album's pre-order, with Perry saying she hoped "it can be a few minutes of energizing hopefulness for you as it is for meee". "Smile" is a nu-disco song which runs for 2 minutes and 47 seconds. It samples Naughty by Nature's 1999 song "Jamboree". The song starts off with an "upbeat hook" and a "dance-driven groove" that leads to the chorus containing lyrics expressing her gratitude for changes in her life: "Yeah, I'm thankful / Scratch that, baby, I'm grateful / Gotta say it's really been a while / But now I got back that smile". On the lyrics, Perry also "extols the virtue of perseverance" after suffering setbacks where every day feels like Groundhog Day as well as "going through motions felt so fake".

The song was inspired by Perry's own experiences and was described by Uproxx as an "ode to remembering life's joys". Speaking about the release of the song, she said "I wrote this song when I was coming through one of the darkest periods of my life. When I listen to it now, it's a great reminder that I made it through. It's three minutes of energizing hopefulness". On some vinyl versions of the album, American rapper Diddy is featured on "Smile". "Smile" was also promoted with remixes by Italian DJ Giorgio Moroder and British DJ Joel Corry.

Critical reception
Vulture's Zoe Haylock called the song "empowering", comparing it to Perry's 2013 single "Roar". Jason Lipshutz from Billboard, also compared "Smile" to Perry's previous songs "Walking on Air" and "Birthday", both taken from Perry's fourth album, Prism (2013), calling "Smile" the "same sort of dizzy glitter-pop" Perry embraced on Prism. In writing for Consequence of Sound, Wren Graves noted the song's positive message, stating that "lyrics [are] overbrimming with warmth and gratitude. The song evokes the light at the end of the tunnel". Insider Callie Ahlgrim labelled the song one of the worst of 2020, calling it "unbearably corny" and comparing it to the children's song "Baby Shark".

Track listing and formats 
Digital download and streaming
"Smile" – 2:47

Digital download and streaming – Giorgio Moroder remix
"Smile" (Giorgio Moroder remix) – 3:07

Digital download and streaming – Joel Corry remix
"Smile" (Joel Corry remix) – 3:02

Digital download and streaming – Joel Corry extended remix
"Smile" (Joel Corry extended remix) – 4:17

Digital download and streaming – M-22 remix
"Smile" (M-22 remix) – 3:00

Digital download and streaming – Marshall Jefferson remix
"Smile" (Marshall Jefferson remix) – 2:38

Digital download and streaming – Tough Love remix
"Smile" (Tough Love remix) – 2:47

Music videos

Performance video
Perry released a performance video for "Smile" on July 14, 2020. In the video, she is dressed as a clown, in her "most fashionable clown attire, wearing an orange, polka-dotted blazer and matching blue jumper with whimsical tuxedo detailing across the front" and performs against a backdrop with a "number of giant clown hands, seated atop a comically oversized clown shoe and more".

Music video
The official "Smile" music video was released on August 14, 2020 and features a video game theme, with Perry switching between real-life cosplay and animated video game characters. It was directed by Mathew Miguel Cullen, with storyboarding by Cullen and Josh Chesler.

Chart performance
"Smile" debuted at number ten on the New Zealand Hot Singles Chart, 22 in Scotland and 73 in the United Kingdom. It also debuted at number twenty-one on the US Bubbling Under Hot 100.

Credits and personnel

Song credits
Credits adapted from Tidal.

Katy Perry – lead vocals, songwriter
Josh Abraham – producer, songwriter
Oligee – producer, songwriter
G Koop – producer, additional producer
Anthony Criss – songwriter, credit song "Jamboree"
Kier Gist – songwriter, credit song "Jamboree"
Vincent Brown – songwriter, credit song "Jamboree"
Benny Golson – songwriter, credit song "Jamboree" and "I'm Always Dancin' to the Music"
Brittany "Starrah" Hazzard – songwriter
Ferras Alqaisi – songwriter
Blake Harden – engineer
Clint "CJMIXEDIT" Badal – engineer
Darth "Denver" Moon – engineer
Louie Gomez – engineer
Manny Marroquin – mixer
Chris Galland – mixing engineer
Dave Kutch – mastering engineer
Dave Richard – associated performer, trumpet
Kamaria Anita Ousley – associated performer, background vocalist
Lincoln Adler – associated performer, saxophone

Music video credits
Adapted from YouTube.

Brandon Bonfiglio - executive producer
Josh Chesler - story
Jeff Cronenweth - director of photography
Mathew Miguel Cullen - director, story
David Goldstein - 1st associate director
Andrew Lerios - producer
Ivan Ovalle - post production supervisor
Luga Podesta - executive producer
Alex Randall - production supervisor
John Richoux - production designer

Charts

Weekly charts

Monthly charts

Certifications

Release history

References

2020 singles
2020 songs
Capitol Records singles
Katy Perry songs
Songs written by Katy Perry
Songs written by Starrah
Songs written by Ferras
Songs written by Oliver Goldstein
Songs written by Josh Abraham
Songs written by Treach
Songs written by KayGee
Songs written by Vin Rock
Song recordings produced by Josh Abraham